Oscar Kilgore is a Honduran journalist and National Party of Honduras politician and former Mayor of San Pedro Sula (2002–2006) he was imprisoned in 2008 for abuse of authority and corruption relating to a loan he received while Mayor.

References

External links
 

Living people
Mayors of places in Honduras
National Party of Honduras politicians
Honduran politicians convicted of crimes
Year of birth missing (living people)